Germán Ignacio Riesco Errázuriz (1888 – November 11, 1958) was a Chilean political figure, who served several times as minister between 1919 and 1950. He was of Basque descent and a member of the influential Errázuriz family.

He was born in Santiago in 1888, the son of President Germán Riesco and of First Lady María Errázuriz Echaurren.  He graduated as a lawyer from the Universidad de Chile on April 21, 1910. He was Minister of War and Navy of President Juan Luis Sanfuentes between 1919 and 1920; and Minister of Foreign Affairs between 1948 and 1950, under President Gabriel González Videla. He married Rosa Barceló Pinto but they had no children.

References

External links
Genealogical chart of Riesco-Errázuriz family 

1888 births
1958 deaths
Politicians from Santiago
Chilean people of Spanish descent
Chilean people of Basque descent
G
Liberal Party (Chile, 1849) politicians
Foreign ministers of Chile
Chilean Ministers of Defense
Deputies of the XXXIV Legislative Period of the National Congress of Chile
Chilean diplomats
Instituto Nacional General José Miguel Carrera alumni
University of Chile alumni